Rafael Almeida Soromenho (born 4 April 1994) is a Portuguese footballer who plays for Sporting Clube Farense B, as a midfielder.

Football career
On 9 January 2013, Soromenho made his professional debut with Olhanense in a 2012–13 Taça da Liga match against Moreirense.

References

External links

Stats and profile at LPFP 

1994 births
Living people
Portuguese footballers
Association football midfielders
S.C. Olhanense players